Alfred W. Redmer Jr. (born January 15, 1956) is Maryland Insurance Commissioner and was the Republican nominee for County Executive of Baltimore County, Maryland in 2018. He formerly served as a legislator in the Maryland House of Delegates, representing District 8 in Baltimore County, prior to being appointed Maryland Insurance Commissioner in 2003.

Education
A lifelong resident of Baltimore County, Redmer graduated from Perry Hall High School, which is in Perry Hall, Maryland, a northeast area Baltimore suburb.  After high school he attended The American College in Bryn Mawr, Pennsylvania.  The American College is a college for life insurance underwriters.

Career
After completing his education, Redmer founded Redmer Insurance & Investment Services. He was also the Marketing and public relations specialist for the Mather Companies. He was a trustee for the Council on Economic Education in Maryland.

Republican Party activities
Redmer was a member of the Republican State Central Committee for 9th District in Baltimore County from 1978-82. He was the co-chair of Ronald Reagan's Presidential Campaign, 8th District, in 1980. He served on the campaign staff for U.S. Representative Helen D. Bentley in 1980 and again in 1982. He was elected as a delegate for the 2nd Congressional District for the 1988 Republican National Convention.

House of Delegates
Redmer was first elected to the Maryland House of Delegates in January 1990 to represent District 8 in Baltimore County, which covers the greater Parkville area. During his tenure in the House of Delegates, Redmer served as Minority Leader from 2001-03. Additionally, he was a member of several committees, including: the Environmental Matters Committee from 1991 until 2003, the Special Joint Committee on Vehicle Emissions Inspection Program from 1995–98, the Joint Legislative Task Force on Organ and Tissue Donations during 1997 and 1998, and the Joint Committee on Health Care Delivery and Financing from 1999 until 2003.

He served on the Legislative Policy Committee from 2001–03, the Spending Affordability Committee from 2001 until 2003, the Rules and Executive Nominations Committee from 2002–03, the Joint Committee on the Selection of the State Treasurer in 2002, and again in 2003, and finally the Health and Government Operations Committee.

Maryland Insurance Commissioner
In 2003, Redmer was appointed Maryland Insurance Commissioner by Governor Bob Ehrlich, resigning his seat in the House of Delegates. Redmer served in this position for two years before resigning to accept a position with Coventry Health Care, a health insurance company located in Delaware.

Redmer was appointed to a second term as Maryland Insurance Commissioner by Gov. Larry Hogan (R) in January 2015.

Kathleen A. Birrane was appointed Maryland Insurance Administration Commissioner May 2020
https://insurance.maryland.gov/AboutUs/Pages/Bio.aspx?Name=Birrane

Candidacy for Baltimore County Executive
Redmer was a candidate for County Executive of Baltimore County in the 2018 election. If elected, he would've been the first Republican County Executive in the heavily-Democratic county in 24 years. He was endorsed by Gov. Hogan in the Republican primary. Redmer stressed his close relationship to Maryland's Republican governor, saying "If you like Larry Hogan, I'm your guy". His campaign advertising called for new schools and improved discipline in schools, while opposing low-income Section 8 housing. He opposed Baltimore County being a sanctuary jurisdiction for illegal immigrants. Redmer pledged not to raise taxes and proposed consideration of a build-leaseback approach with private sector participation to finance the construction of replacements for three County high schools: Dulaney, Lansdowne, and Towson High School.

Redmer was defeated by Democrat Johnny Olszewski in the general election.

Election results
2002 Race for Maryland House of Delegates – District 08
Voters to choose three:
{| class="wikitable"
|-
!Name
!Votes
!Percent
!Outcome
|-
|-
|Alfred W. Redmer Jr.
|22,884
|  19.61%
|   Won
|-
|-
|Eric M. Bromwell
|20,314
|  17.41%
|   Won
|-
|-
|Joseph C. Boteler III, Rep.
|19,826
|  16.99%
|   Won
|-
|-
|Mike Rupp
|18,755
|  16.07%
|   Lost
|-
|-
|Tim Caslin
|18,553
|  15.90%
|   Lost
|-
|-
|Todd Schuler
|16,277
|  13.95%
|   Lost
|-
|Other Write-Ins
|86
|  0.07%
|   Lost
|-
|}

1998 Race for Maryland House of Delegates – District 08
Voters to choose three:
{| class="wikitable"
|-
!Name
!Votes
!Percent
!Outcome
|-
|-
|Katherine Klausmeier, Dem.
|19,835
|  21%
|   Won
|-
|-
|Alfred W. Redmer Jr., Rep
|17,846
|  19%
|   Won
|-
|-
|James F. Ports Jr., Rep.
|17,756
|  19%
|   Won
|-
|-
|J. Joseph Curran III, Dem.
|17,583
|  19%
|   Lost
|-
|-
|Joseph C. Boteler III, Rep.
|11,306
|  12%
|   Lost
|-
|-
|Taras Andrew Vizzi, Dem.
|9,927
|  11%
|   Lost
|-
|}

1994 Race for Maryland House of Delegates – District 08
Voters to choose three:
{| class="wikitable"
|-
!Name
!Votes
!Percent
!Outcome
|-
|-
|Katherine Klausmeier, Dem.
|17,496
|  20%
|   Won
|-
|-
|Alfred W. Redmer Jr., Rep.
|14,876
|  18%
|   Won
|-
|-
|James F. Ports Jr., Rep.
|15,244
|  17%
|   Won
|-
|-
|Calvin Clemons, Rep.
|13,996
|  16%
|   Lost
|-
|-
|Daniel E. McKew, Dem.
|12,931
|  15%
|   Lost
|-
|-
|John G. Disney, Dem.
|11,886
|  14%
|   Lost
|-
|}

1990 Race for Maryland House of Delegates – District 08
Voters to choose three:
{| class="wikitable"
|-
!Name
!Votes
!Percent
!Outcome
|-
|-
|Alfred W. Redmer Jr., Rep.
|15,354
|  18%
|   Won
|-
|-
|Joseph Bartenfelder, Dem.
|14,876
|  18%
|   Won
|-
|-
|James F. Ports Jr., Rep.
|14,266
|  17%
|   Won
|-
|-
|Kenneth G. Hirsch, Rep.
|14,129
|  17%
|   Lost
|-
|-
|Donna M. Felling, Dem.
|13,006
|  15%
|   Lost
|-
|-
|William J. Burgess, Dem.
|12,680
|  15%
|   Lost
|-
|-
|John Michael Fleig
|20
|  0%
|   Lost
|-
|}

1986 Race for Maryland House of Delegates – District 08
Voters to choose three:
{| class="wikitable"
|-
!Name
!Votes
!Percent
!Outcome
|-
|-
|Joseph Bartenfelder, Dem.
|18,245
|  23%
|   Won
|-
|-
|Donna M. Felling, Dem.
|16,443
|  21%
|   Won
|-
|-
|William J. Burgess, Dem.
|16,049
|  20%
|   Won
|-
|-
|Scott A. Sewell, Rep.
|11,610
|  15%
|   Lost
|-
|-
|Alfred W. Redmer Jr., Rep.
|10,841
|  14%
|   Lost
|-
|-
|Howard C. Harclerode, Rep.
|5,782
|  7%
|   Lost
|-
|}

References and notes

External links
 http://www.msa.md.gov/msa/mdmanual/06hse/former/html/msa12299.html

Republican Party members of the Maryland House of Delegates
1956 births
People from Baltimore County, Maryland
Living people
The American College of Financial Services alumni
State insurance commissioners of the United States